Trigonopterus dacrycarpi is a species of flightless weevil in the genus Trigonopterus from Indonesia.

Etymology
The specific name is derived from that of the conifer genus Dacrycarpus.

Description
Individuals measure around 2.36–3.06 mm in length.  General coloration is rust-colored, darker on the top of the head and pronotum, and bronze tinted in the center of the elytron.

Range
It is found in Batu Dulang and Tepal on the island of Sumbawa in the Indonesian province of West Nusa Tenggara, and around Mount Ranaka and Lake Ranamese on the island of Flores in the East Nusa Tenggara province.

Phylogeny
T. dacrycarpi is part of the T. dimorphus species group.  The two populations (from Sumbawa and Flores) have a 7.5–9.7% p-distance difference, but have no morphological differences.

Diet
The species feeds on the conifer genus Dacrycarpus, and may also feed on other plants that grow in proximity to Dacrycarpus.

References

dacrycarpi
Beetles described in 2014
Beetles of Asia
Insects of Indonesia